Standards is a 1998 compilation album by jazz pianist Sonny Clark recorded for the Blue Note label and performed by Clark with Jymie Merritt or Paul Chambers, and Wes Landers, combining sessions previously released as The Art of The Trio and Blues in the Night.

Reception
The album was awarded 3 stars by Stephen Thomas Erlewine in an Allmusic review which stated "Although some of the performances are a little brief, limiting his opportunity to solo, Standards is a lovely collection of beautiful music that's a welcome addition to Clark's catalog".

Track listing
 "Blues in the Night" (Harold Arlen, Johnny Mercer) - 5:54
 "Can't We Be Friends?" (Paul James, Kay Swift) - 4:20
 "Somebody Loves Me" (Buddy DeSylva, George Gershwin, Ballard MacDonald) - 4:18
 "All of You" (Cole Porter) - 3:54
 "Dancing in the Dark" (Arthur Schwartz, Howard Dietz) - 3:31
 "I Cover the Waterfront" (Johnny Green, Edward Heyman) - 4:41
 "Blues in the Night" [Alternate Take] - 7:15
 "Gee, Baby, Ain't I Good to You" (Andy Razaf, Don Redman) - 4:01
 "Ain't No Use" (Leroy Kirkland, Sidney Wyche) - 4:49
 "I Can't Give You Anything But Love" (Dorothy Fields, Jimmy McHugh) - 3:52
 "Black Velvet" (Illinois Jacquet, Jimmy Mundy) - 3:23
 "I'm Just a Lucky So-and-So (Mack David, Duke Ellington) - 4:33
 "The Breeze and I" (Tutti Camarata, Ernesto Lecuona, Al Stillman) - 4:00
 "Gee Baby, Ain't I Good to You" [Alternate Take] - 3:49

Recorded on November 16 (#8-14) and December 7 (#1-7), 1958.

Personnel
Sonny Clark - piano
Jymie Merritt (#8-14), Paul Chambers (#1-7) - bass
Wes Landers - drums

Production
 Alfred Lion - producer
 Reid Miles - design
 Rudy Van Gelder - engineer
 Francis Wolff - photography

References

Sonny Clark albums
1998 albums
Blue Note Records albums
Albums produced by Alfred Lion
Albums recorded at Van Gelder Studio